Bakulan is a village in the Kecamatan, Kemangkon, Purbalingga, Central Java, Indonesia

References

Bakulan